HSY may refer to:

 Hassan Sheheryar Yasin, Pakistani fashion designer
 HSY Studio, his fashion label
 Hellenic Shipyards Co., a Greek shipyard
 The Hershey Company, an American chocolatier
 Horsley railway station, in England